Marie-Anne Montchamp (born 1 November 1957) is a French politician who served as a member of the National Assembly, represents a constituency in the Val-de-Marne department. From 2010 to 2012, she served as Secretary of State for Solidarities and Social Cohesion under Minister Roselyne Bachelot-Narquin.

Political career 
In parliament, Montchamp served on the Committee on Economic Affairs and the Environment (2005–2007) and the Finance Committee (2002–2004, 2007–2010).

When President Nicolas Sarkozy was first publicly confronted with evidence in 2010 that his party received illegal campaign donations in cash from heiress Liliane Bettencourt via Labour Minister Éric Woerth as part of a vast system of patronage, Montchamp publicly urged the president to bring forward a reshuffle.

Montchamp was the party's candidate for the Fourth constituency for French residents overseas in the June 2012 legislative election.

In March 2017, Montchamp announced that she was leaving the Republicans (LR) to join presidential candidate Emmanuel Macron and his movement La République En Marche! (LREM).

Later career 
In 2017, Montchamp was appointed by Minister of Solidarity and Health Agnès Buzyn and the Secretary of State for the Disabled Sophie Cluzel to the Board of Directors of the National Solidarity Fund for Autonomy (CNSA).

References 

1957 births
Living people
People from Tulle
Rally for the Republic politicians
Union for a Popular Movement politicians
United Republic politicians
Women members of the National Assembly (France)
Deputies of the 12th National Assembly of the French Fifth Republic
Deputies of the 13th National Assembly of the French Fifth Republic
21st-century French women politicians
Politicians from Nouvelle-Aquitaine
Government ministers of France